Socrate Safo is a Ghanaian director, filmmaker, and Director for Creative Arts at the National Commission on Culture  (NCC) in Ghana. He is a prominent figure in Ghallywood and head of Move Africa Productions.

Career
Safo began his filmmaking career while working as a janitor in a movie theater. He was initially training to be an auto mechanic. It was during this time he filmed his 1992 movie Ghost Tears, which became a commercial success. The movie helped pioneer the Ghanaian ghost film genre.

Safo was Public Relations Officer of the Film Producers Association of Ghana. He featured prominently in the 2011 VICE documentary The Sakawa Boys, which spoke about Safo's influence on the Sakawa movement in Ghana. Safo claims to have made more than 100 movies between 1988 and the filming of the documentary.

In June 2017, Safo was appointed as Director for Creative Arts at the NCC. Previously, he had been working as Executive Secretary at the NCC.

In May 2020, Safo was appointed by Barbara Oteng Gyasi as Chairman of the Film Classification Committee, formed under the National Film Authority of Ghana. The goal of the committee is to regulate and promote the Ghanaian film industry. In 2021, he announced his retirement from filmmaking.

Awards and nominations

References

External links
Socrate Safo on IMDb

Living people
Ghanaian film directors
Year of birth missing (living people)